Butley is a 1974 American-British drama film directed by Harold Pinter and starring Alan Bates, Jessica Tandy, Richard O'Callaghan, Susan Engel, and Michael Byrne. It is an adaptation from Simon Gray's 1971 play of same name. It was produced by Ely Landau and released through Landau's American Film Theatre.

Plot
The title character, a literature professor and longtime T. S. Eliot scholar with a recently developed interest in Beatrix Potter, is a suicidal alcoholic, who loses his wife and his male lover on the same day. The dark comedy encompasses several hours in which he bullies students, friends, and colleagues, while falling apart at the seams. Apart from an opening sequence of Butley waking in his flat with a hangover and taking the Underground and occasional shots in the corridor and the pub at lunchtime, the entire film takes place in Butley's office.

In his introduction to the trade edition of the play, the film's director Harold Pinter wrote:

Cast

Production
The film was shot at Shepperton Studios. The Executive Producer was Otto Plaschkes and the cinematographer was Gerry Fisher.

See also
 List of American films of 1974

References

External links

1974 films
American drama films
American LGBT-related films
Bisexuality-related films
British drama films
British LGBT-related films
Canadian drama films
Films about educators
American films based on plays
Films produced by Ely Landau
1974 LGBT-related films
LGBT-related drama films
1974 drama films
Films set in universities and colleges
Canadian LGBT-related films
1970s English-language films
1970s American films
1970s Canadian films
1970s British films